Juan Martín López (born 27 May 1985) is an Argentine field hockey player for Banco Provincia. At the 2012 Summer Olympics, he competed for the national team in the men's tournament. Juan Martín has won the bronze medal at the 2014 Men's Hockey World Cup and three gold medals at the Pan American Games. The midfielder was also part of the Argentinian squad which won the gold medal at the 2016 Summer Olympics. He plays club hockey for Banco Provincia.

References

External links

Living people
1985 births
Argentine male field hockey players
Male field hockey defenders
Olympic field hockey players of Argentina
2006 Men's Hockey World Cup players
2010 Men's Hockey World Cup players
Field hockey players at the 2011 Pan American Games
Field hockey players at the 2012 Summer Olympics
2014 Men's Hockey World Cup players
Field hockey players at the 2015 Pan American Games
Field hockey players at the 2016 Summer Olympics
2018 Men's Hockey World Cup players
Field hockey players at the 2019 Pan American Games
Pan American Games gold medalists for Argentina
Olympic gold medalists for Argentina
Olympic medalists in field hockey
Medalists at the 2016 Summer Olympics
Pan American Games medalists in field hockey
Expatriate field hockey players
Argentine expatriate sportspeople in Belgium
Field hockey players from Buenos Aires
Medalists at the 2015 Pan American Games
Medalists at the 2019 Pan American Games
Medalists at the 2011 Pan American Games
Field hockey players at the 2020 Summer Olympics
21st-century Argentine people